Mandy Van Deven is a philanthropy consultant — with particular emphasis on gender, racial, and economic justice and fortifying the infrastructure for narrative power. She is a contributor to Inside Philanthropy, the co-author of “Hey, Shorty! A Guide to Combating Sexual Harassment and Violence in School and on the Streets” (2011) and the editor of Polyphonic Feminisms: Acting in Concert. She has written for Salon, The Guardian, Refinery29, GlobalPost, Marie Claire (India), and Newsweek.

Background 
Van Deven was raised in Athens, Georgia and attended Georgia State University in Atlanta, where she got involved in social justice activism and independent media. She moved to New York City in 2003 and became a community organizer at Girls for Gender Equity (GGE). She has a Master of Social Work (Organizational Management and Leadership) from the Silberman School of Social Work at Hunter College.

Career 
Van Deven has written about many topics, including philanthropy, making humanitarian aid more accountable, race, poverty in America, child marriage, women's safety in public spaces, and global health.

She was the guest editor of the Summer 2010 issue of Barnard Center for Research on Women's online journal, “The Scholar & Feminist Online.” The issue was entitled Polyphonic Feminisms: Acting in Concert.

In 2011, she co-authored “Hey, Shorty! A Guide to Combating Sexual Harassment and Violence in School and on the Streets” with Girls for Gender Equity's founder and executive director, Joanne N. Smith, and former director of community organizing, Meghan Huppuch.

Van Deven has spoken to audiences throughout the United States, including at Barnard College and Sarah Lawrence College. She has been featured in Mic, Salon, In These Times, Progressive Radio, and Alternet.

Selected bibliography
 “Hey, Shorty! A Guide to Combating Sexual Harassment and Violence in School and on the Streets” (2011). Feminist Press.

References

External links 
 
 Inside Philanthropy
 The Guardian
 Salon
 Newsweek
 Refinery29

1980 births
Living people